The 2007–08 UNLV Runnin' Rebels basketball team represented the University of Nevada, Las Vegas. The team was coached by Lon Kruger, returning for his fourth year with the Runnin' Rebels. They played their home games at the Thomas & Mack Center on UNLV's main campus in Paradise, Nevada and were a member of the Mountain West Conference. The Runnin' Rebels finished the season 27–8, 12–4 in MWC play. They won the 2008 Mountain West Conference men's basketball tournament to receive an automatic bid to the 2008 NCAA Division I men's basketball tournament, earning an 8 seed in the Midwest Region. The Runnin' Rebels defeated 9 seed Kent State in the opening round before losing to 1 seed and eventual National champion Kansas in the second round.

Roster

Schedule and results 

|-
!colspan=9 style=| Regular season

|-
!colspan=9 style=| MWC tournament

|-
!colspan=9 style=| NCAA tournament

Rankings

References 

UNLV Runnin' Rebels basketball seasons
UNLV
UNLV
UNLV Runnin' Rebels basketball team
UNLV Runnin' Rebels basketball team